Djaló is the Portuguese and Creole transcription of a surname of Fula origin (English transcriptions are Jalloh and Jallow; the French transcription is Diallo), and may refer to:

Adiato Djaló Nandigna (born 1958), Bissau-Guinean politician
Aldair Baldé (Aldair Adulai Djaló Baldé, born 1992), Bissau-Guinean/Portuguese footballer
Aliu Djaló (born 1992), Bissau-Guinean footballer
Álvaro Djaló (born 1999), Spanish footballer
Bacari Djaló (born 1983), Bissau-Guinean footballer
Bobó Djalo (born 1963), Bissau-Guinean footballer
Bubacar Djaló (born 1996), Bissau-Guinean footballer
Idrissa Djaló (born 1962), Bissau-Guinean politician
Malcom Adu Ares (Malcom Abdulai Ares Djaló, born 2001), Spanish footballer
Mamadú Iaia Djaló (c. 1962–2021), Bissau-Guinean politician
Mamadu Saliu Djaló Pires, Bissau-Guinean politician
Marcelo Amado (Marcelo Amado Djaló Taritolay, born 1993), Bissau-Guinean/Spanish footballer
Tiago Djaló (Tiago Emanuel Embaló Djaló, born 2000), Portuguese footballer
Yannick Djaló (born 1986), Bissau-Guinean footballer

Fula surnames